Montargull may refer to:

 Montargull (Artesa de Segre), village in the Artesa de Segre municipality, Catalonia
 Montargull (La Vansa i Fórnols), in the municipality of la Vansa i Fórnols, Catalonia
 Montargull (Llorac), small abandoned village in the municipality of Llorac, Catalonia
 Montargull (Avinyonet del Penedès), masia in the municipality of Avinyonet del Penedès, Catalonia